The Park MGM, formerly Monte Carlo Resort and Casino, is a megaresort hotel and casino on the Las Vegas Strip in Paradise, Nevada, United States. It is owned by Vici Properties and operated by MGM Resorts International. The hotel offers 2,992 guest rooms, including 259 luxury suites. The Monte Carlo was converted into Park MGM between late 2016 and 2018, with the upper floors being converted into a boutique hotel, NoMad Las Vegas.

The hotel, formerly named to invoke the Place du Casino in Monte Carlo, featured chandelier domes, marble floors, neoclassical arches, ornate fountains, and gas-lit promenades.

Facilities and attractions
The original Monte Carlo included  of retail stores, plus convention facilities, a spa, fitness center, a hair salon, a  exercise room,  a pool area, which includes a wave pool & lazy river, and the Street of Dreams  shopping area collection of retail stores which includes Optica, Marshall Rousso, Misura, Harley Davidson of Las Vegas and Art of Music. A  pool area includes a wave pool with constantly changing wave patterns, and a "Lazy River" feature. The CityCenter Tram offers access to the Bellagio and Crystals retail district in the CityCenter complex, with service every 5 minutes.

On October 7, 2010, the Jabbawockeez began performance of their residency at Monte Carlo, entitled "MÜS.I.C". This show was originally performed five nights per week at the 1,224-seat Monte Carlo Theater. The venue was previously known as the Lance Burton Theatre and hosted magician Lance Burton, who performed there between June 21, 1996, and September 4, 2010. In 2012, the JabbaWockeeZ show moved to the 800-seat Monte Carlo Pavilion. On October 11, 2015, Blue Man Group discontinued its show at the Monte Carlo and returned to the Luxor to open a new show, which premiered on November 18, 2015.

Dolby Live theater (2016-present) 

The 5,200-seat Park Theater opened at the resort on December 17, 2016, and was renamed Dolby Live in 2021. The theater has had residencies by Ricky Martin (All In) and Cher (Classic Cher). The theater will be holding a 2 year residency by Lady Gaga from December 28, 2018, until further notice called Enigma as well as the first concert residency by Janet Jackson beginning in May 2019 titled Janet Jackson: Metamorphosis.

On October 18, 2018, Britney Spears announced a new residency show at the Park Theater opening in February 2019 titled Britney: Domination, but it was cancelled.

Advertising
As of 2009, the Monte Carlo print advertising campaign featured intentionally misspelled French words ("tray sheek") coupled with glamorous images. The campaign's tagline was "Unpretentiously luxurious".

History

Monte Carlo

Construction and opening

Park MGM is located on part of the former site of the Dunes casino and golf course. Mirage Resorts purchased the Dunes in 1992 and closed it in January 1993. Ground was broken for the hotel in March 1995. Circus Circus Enterprises acquired Gold Strike in June 1995 and took over its role of managing the project.

Gold Strike had hoped to name the project as the Grand Victoria, the same name as the casino being developed by the company in Illinois, but that idea was discarded because of potential confusion with the MGM Grand. "Victoria" and "Victoria Bay" were reported as likely names for the property. Details about the property were revealed in July 1995, including that it would be named the Monte Carlo and feature Belle Époque architecture, based on the Monte Carlo Casino in Monaco.

The Monte Carlo opened to the public at midnight on June 21, 1996, following an invitation-only pre-opening celebration, including a fireworks show. The project ultimately cost $344 million to build.

2008 fire
On January 25, 2008, at 10:57 AM, a three-alarm fire was reported on the exterior of the top six floors and roof of the casino. Portions of the hotel facade's Exterior Insulation Finishing System burned with some debris falling and starting smaller secondary fires on ledges three floors below. The fire was fully contained an hour after it began. It was an exterior fire, although there was water damage to parts of several floors. The Hotel & Casino reopened to guests on February 15, 2008. MGM Mirage officials put the total losses due to fire damage and loss of business at just under $100 million.  Fire investigators interviewed witnesses and investigated the scene, and determined the likely cause of the fire was the improper cutting and welding operations by contractors who were installing a steel catwalk.

Transition to Park MGM (2016–present)

In June 2016, MGM announced a joint venture with Sydell Group that the Monte Carlo would be renovated and rebranded as the Park MGM, named after the adjacent dining and entertainment district, The Park, that opened in April 2016, and the NoMad Hotel would occupy the top floors. It would feature a new Eataly restaurant. Both hotels began construction at the end of 2016, with completion planned for 2018. The property was officially renamed Park MGM on May 9, 2018. The resorts opened a new entertainment venue, the Park Theater, in December 2016.

Ownership of the Monte Carlo, along with many other MGM properties, was transferred in 2016 to MGM Growth Properties (later acquired by Vici Properties in 2022), while MGM Resorts continued to operate it under a lease agreement.

Nevada casinos were ordered to close in March 2020, due to the COVID-19 pandemic and its effects on the state. The state's casinos began reopening a few months later. When Park MGM and NoMad reopened on September 30, 2020, it instituted a non-smoking policy, becoming the only casino resort on the Las Vegas Strip to be smoke-free. This was done to attract a non-smoking clientele who dislike the cigarette smoke that is typically associated with casinos. The timing for such a decision was considered appropriate, as there was support for smoke-free policies amid the pandemic. The non-smoking policy had previously been considered two years earlier, until MGM Resorts passed on the idea. Smoking is still permitted in designated outdoor areas.

NoMad Las Vegas
Hotel32 was an ultra-luxury, boutique hotel located on Monte Carlo's top floor. The new extension opened on August 10, 2009. The hotel had 50 lofts ranging in size from  studios to  penthouses and could only be accessed via a private elevator. All Hotel32 guests had access to a dedicated Suite Assistant, who provides personal butler and concierge services and numerous high-tech touches, including a TV integrated into the bathroom mirror. Guests had access to Lounge32, which overlooks the Las Vegas skyline. Hotel32 offered its guests a branded iPhone at check-in to promote the use of hotel amenities. The system, running Hotel Evolution software, enabled the hotel to make changes to services easily, because updates were made automatically.

In June 2016, MGM announced a joint venture with the Sydell Group that the Hotel 32 would be renovated and rebranded as the 300-room NoMad Las Vegas.

In popular culture
Monte Carlo Resort and Casino has figured in several feature films and television series. Major release films partially filmed at Monte Carlo include the 2000 film Get Carter and 2008's What Happens in Vegas. In the 2004 film Dodgeball: A True Underdog Story, the Average Joes stay at Monte Carlo during the dodgeball championships in Las Vegas. In the Amazing Race 15, teams had to count out $1 million worth of poker chips here in the season finale, to receive their next clue. It was also featured in the season six episode "Three of a Kind" of The X-Files.

Gallery

References

External links

 

 
1996 establishments in Nevada
Casino hotels
Casinos completed in 1996
Casinos in the Las Vegas Valley
Hotel buildings completed in 1996
Hotels established in 1996
Mandalay Resort Group
Resorts in the Las Vegas Valley
Skyscraper hotels in Paradise, Nevada